The eleventh government of Israel was formed on 26 June 1963,  midway through the fifth Knesset. It was the first government formed by Levi Eshkol following the second resignation of David Ben-Gurion.

Eshkol kept the same coalition partners as previously, i.e. Mapai, the National Religious Party, Ahdut HaAvoda, Poalei Agudat Yisrael, Cooperation and Brotherhood and Progress and Development. There were few changes, with Eshkol replacing Ben-Gurion in the dual role of Prime Minister and Minister of Defense, Pinhas Sapir replacing Eshkol as Minister of Finance, and Abba Eban replacing Zalman Aran as Education Minister, as well as becoming the country's second Deputy Prime Minister. Eshkol presented it as a "government of continuity". Deputy Ministers were appointed on 1 July.

The government resigned following the resignation of Eshkol on 14 December 1964. Eshkol had quit over a dispute with Ben-Gurion concerning the Lavon Affair, which Ben Gurion had demanded that the Supreme Court investigate. The twelfth government was formed a week later.

Cabinet members

1 Although Gvati was not an MK at the time, he later entered the Knesset as a member of the Alignment, a merger or Mapai and Ahdut HaAvoda.

2 Although Yosef was not an MK at the time, he was a member of Mapai.

3 Although Sasson was not an MK at the time, he was elected to the next Knesset as a member of the Alignment, an alliance of Mapai and Ahdut HaAvoda.

References

External links
Knesset 5: Government 11 Knesset website

 11
1963 establishments in Israel
1964 disestablishments in Israel
Cabinets established in 1963
Cabinets disestablished in 1964
1963 in Israeli politics
1964 in Israeli politics
 11